Shenstone is a civil parish in the district of Lichfield, Staffordshire, England.  It contains 54 buildings that are recorded in the National Heritage List for England.  Of these, two are listed at Grade II*, the middle grade, and the others are at Grade II, the lowest grade.  The parish contains the villages of Shenstone and Stonnall, the area of Little Aston, and the surrounding countryside.  Most of the listed buildings are houses and associated structures, cottages, farmhouses and farm buildings.  The other listed buildings include three churches, the isolated tower from a previous church, the rest of which has been demolished, public houses, a bridge, a war memorial, two mileposts, and two pumping stations.


Key

Buildings

Notes and references

Notes

Citations

Sources

Lists of listed buildings in Staffordshire